No Strings is a British television sitcom which aired on ITV in one series of seven episodes in 1989.

Synopsis
After Sam and Rosie find their respective spouses are cheating on them together, they meet and begin to bond.

Cast
 Edward Petherbridge as Sam Jessop 
 Jean Marsh as Rosie Tindall
 Amanda Waring as Sally Tindall 
 John McAndrew as  Joe Jessop 
 Graham McGrath as  Nick Jessop 
 Robert Fyfe as  Grandad 
 Alison Bettles as  Sonia 
 Sam Smart as  Darren

References

External links
 

1989 British television series debuts
1989 British television series endings
1980s British comedy television series
ITV sitcoms
English-language television shows